West Okapa Rural LLG is a local-level government (LLG) of Eastern Highlands Province, Papua New Guinea.

Wards
01. Kemiu
02. Kokopi
03. Wayoepa
04. Tarabo
05. Ke'efu
06. Yagana
07. Haga

References

Local-level governments of Eastern Highlands Province